The Udyog Bhawan Metro Station is located on the Yellow Line of the Delhi Metro.

Motilal Nehru Place and the National Museum, Janpath are located nearby.

History

Station layout

Facilities

Entry/exit

Connections

Bus
Delhi Transport Corporation bus routes number 433, 433CL, 460, 460CL, 480, 500, 520, 540, 548, 604, 610, 610A, 620, 630, 632, 680, 720, 725, 770ALT, 780, 781, AC-620, AC-781, serves the station from nearby Uduog Bhawan bus stop.

See also

References

External links

 Delhi Metro Rail Corporation Ltd. (Official site) 
 Delhi Metro Annual Reports
 

Delhi Metro stations
Railway stations opened in 2010
Railway stations in New Delhi district
2010 establishments in Delhi